"Heilig", a song by the German rock-band Tokio Hotel, appears on their second album, Zimmer 483. The song was released as the album's fourth single on 28 April in France. Due to tight scheduling, no music video for the single was released. It was translated and recorded for their first English album, Scream, as "Sacred" but it has not been released as a single.

Formats and track listings
These are the formats and track listings of major single releases of "Heilig".
CD Single
"Heilig" - 4:03
"Break away" (live in Milan) - 4:22
"1000 Meere" - 4:04

Charts

References

Tokio Hotel songs
2008 singles
Songs written by David Jost
Songs written by Bill Kaulitz
2007 songs